Ranke is a German surname. Persons with the surname include:

 Clarissa von Ranke (1808-1871), Irish poet
 Friedrich Heinrich Ranke (1798–1876), German theologian
 Heinrich von Ranke (1830–1909), German physiologist and physician
 Hermann Ranke (1878–1953), German Egyptologist
 Johannes Ranke (1836–1916), German physiologist and anthropologist 
 Karl Ernst Ranke (1870–1926), German pathologist
 Karl Ferdinand Ranke (1802–1876), German educator
 Leopold von Ranke (1795–1886), German historian